In the AFL Women's (AFLW), the Brisbane best and fairest award is awarded to the best and fairest player at the Brisbane Lions during the home-and-away season. The award has been awarded annually since the competition's inaugural season in 2017, and Emily Bates was the inaugural winner of the award.

Recipients

See also

 Merrett–Murray Medal (list of Brisbane Lions best and fairest winners in the Australian Football League)

References

AFL Women's awards
  
Awards established in 2017
Lists of AFL Women's players